The coppernose barb (Raiamas christyi) is a species of cyprinid fish in the genus Raiamas who are found in the Congo River system in Africa.

References 

Raiamas
Cyprinid fish of Africa
Fish described in 1920